is a Japanese pharmacologist and novelist. Sena was a graduate student at Tohoku University when he wrote his prizewinning debut novel, Parasite Eve.

Writing career
His most famous novel, Parasite Eve, was adapted into a film directed by Masayuki Ochiai in 1997 and a popular horror role-playing video game by Square. When Parasite Eve was adapted as a video game,  Hideaki Sena did not learn the title's plot until it was completed, since the game was a collaboration between Square and his publisher. He is also the author of Brain Valley, for which he won the Nihon SF Taisho Award, and Tomorrow's Robots.

Personal life
Dr. Sena currently lives in Sendai, Japan where he lectures on microbiology and genre fiction.
Sena is a pen name, while the author's real name is Suzuki.

Works

Novels 
 パラサイト・イヴ Parasite Eve (Kadokawa Shoten, 1995 / Kadokawa Horror Bunko, 1996 / Shincho Bunko, 2007)
 BRAIN VALLEY (Kadokawa Shoten, 1997 / Kadokawa Bunko, 2000 / Shincho Bunko, 2005)
 八月の博物館 Hachigatsu no Hakubutsukan (August Museum) (Kadokawa Shoten, 2000 / Kadokawa Bunko, 2003 / Shincho Bunko, 2006)
 デカルトの密室 Dekaruto no Misshitsu (Descartes' Locked Room) (Shinchosha, 2005)
 エヴリブレス Every Breath (Tokyo FM, 2008)
 小説版ドラえもん のび太と鉄人兵団 Shōsetsuban Doraemon - Nobita to Tetsujin Heidan (Doraemon: Nobita and the Steel Troops) (Shogakukan, 2011)
 大空のドロテ Ōzora no Dorote (Dorothée's Sky) (Futabasha, 2012). Published in 3 volumes between October and December 2012; further publication in 2 volumes in November 2015 by the same publisher.
 この青い空で君をつつもう Kono Aoi Sora de Kimi wo Tsutsumō (Let's Wrap You in This Blue Sky) (Futabasha, 2016)
 魔法を召し上がれ Mahō wo Meshiagare (Enjoy My Magic) (Kodansha, 2019)
 小説 ブラック・ジャック Shōsetsu Burakku Jakku (Black Jack) (Seibundo Seikosha, 2019). Original novel based on the manga series.

Novellas 
 虹の天象儀 Niji no Tenshōgi (The Rainbow Planetarium) (Shodensha, 2001) (Astronomic Museum, Goto Planetarium) Set in Tonichi Tenmonkan Astronomic Museum
 ゴッサマー・スカイ Gossamer Sky (e-novels, 2007)

Collections 
 あしたのロボット Ashita no Robotto (Tomorrow's Robots) (Bungeishunju, 2002).
 Re-published under the title ハル Hal (Bungeishunju, 2005).
 第九の日　The Tragedy of Joy Daiku no Hi - The Tragedy of Joy (The 9th Day - The Tragedy of Joy) (Kobunsha, 2006)
 希望 Kibō (Hope) (Hayakawa Shobo, 2011)
 月と太陽 Tsuki to Taiyō (The Moon and The Sun) (Kodansha, 2013)
 夜の虹彩 Yoru no Kōsai (The Iris of The Night) (Shuppan Geijutsusha, 2014)
 新生 Shinsei (New Life) (Kawade Shobo Shinsha, 2014)

Anthologies edited 
 ロボット・オペラ Robot Opera: An Anthology of Robot Fiction and Robot Culture (Kobunsha, 2004)

Nonfiction 
 小説と科学　文理を超えて創造する Shōsetsu to Kagaku - Bunri wo Koete Sōzō Suru (Novels & Science - Creation Surpassing the Science/Literature Boundary) (Iwanami Shoten, 1999).
 Extended under the title ハートのタイムマシン！　瀬名秀明の小説 / 理科倶楽部 Hāto no Taimu Mashin! Sena Hideaki no Shōsetsu / Rika Kurabu (The Heart's Time Machine! - A Novel by Hideaki Sena / Science Club) (Kadokawa Shoten, 2002) 
 ロボット21世紀 Robotto Nijūisseiki (21st Century Robot) (Bungeishunju Bunshun New Works, 2001)
 おとぎの国の科学 Otogi no Kuni no Kagaku (Science in Wonderland) (Shobunsha, 2006)
 瀬名秀明ロボット学論集 Sena Hideaki Robotto Gakuronshū (Hideaki Sena's Essays on Robots) (Keiso Shobo, 2008)
 瀬名秀明解説全集＋α Sena Hideaki Kaisetsu Zenshū Purasu Arufa (Hideaki Sena's Complete Commentaries + α) (e-novels, 2008)
 Computer Kakumei: Saikyou × Saisoku no Zunou Tanjou (2012)

References

External links
 Hideaki Sena's Homepage (Japanese)
 
 

20th-century Japanese novelists
21st-century Japanese novelists
1968 births
Living people
Japanese science fiction writers
Japanese horror writers
Japanese pharmacologists
People from Sendai
Tohoku University alumni
People from Shizuoka (city)
Japanese pharmacists
20th-century pseudonymous writers
21st-century pseudonymous writers